Motoo Noguchi is a Japanese judge and chairman of the Board of Directors of the Trust Fund for Victims at the International Criminal Court.

His other and former positions include:
 Prosecutor in Japan (1985-1996)
 Professor at the Research & Training Institute of the Ministry of Justice (1996-2000)
 Counsel at the Office of the General Counsel of Asian Development Bank (2000-2004)
 Professor at UNAFEI (2004-2012)
 International judge of the Supreme Court Chamber at the Extraordinary Chambers in the Courts of Cambodia (ECCC, 2006-2012)

References

External links

"What the Khmer Rouge Trials Have So Far Achieved" by Mr. Motoo Noguchi

Living people
Year of birth missing (living people)
Japanese judges
Khmer Rouge Tribunal judges